Chusclan is a commune in the Gard department in southern France.

Geography

Climate

Chusclan has a hot-summer Mediterranean climate (Köppen climate classification Csa).

Population

See also
 Côtes du Rhône Villages AOC
Communes of the Gard department

References

External links

 Official site 

Communes of Gard